The Moriarty Eclipse Windmill is a historic windpump near Moriarty, New Mexico.  The windpump was built in 1890 and added to the National Register of Historic Places in 1979.

It was deemed notable as "one of the best preserved historic windmills in New Mexico," although it was not then functioning and was in need of repair.

See also

Eclipse windmill
Canon Ranch Railroad Eclipse Windmill
National Register of Historic Places listings in Torrance County, New Mexico

References

Windpumps in the United States
Agricultural buildings and structures on the National Register of Historic Places in New Mexico
Buildings and structures in Torrance County, New Mexico
1890s architecture in the United States
Windmills completed in 1890
Wind power in New Mexico
Agricultural buildings and structures in New Mexico
National Register of Historic Places in Torrance County, New Mexico
1890 establishments in New Mexico Territory
Fairbanks-Morse
Windmills on the National Register of Historic Places